Wyoming Highway 13 (WYO 13) is a  Wyoming state highway known as Arlington Road in eastern Carbon and western Albany counties.

Route description
Wyoming Highway 13 begins its western end at I-80 in Arlington located in Carbon County. WYO 13 continues its northeastern track through Albany County for another  to its east end at U.S. Routes 30 and 287 in Rock River.

According to aaroads.com, the Arlington exit (Exit 272) off Interstate 80 is known to be one of the worst sections along the entire transcontinental freeway in terms of wind, ice, and snow. The Interstate is frequently closed during the winter months and a sign posted near the highway's northern terminus at US 30 / US 287 indicates whether the road is closed. In addition to that, as recently as February 2002, Exit 272 was not marked as Wyoming Highway 13, even though that route begins at this exit.

Major intersections

References

 Official 2003 State Highway Map of Wyoming

External links 

 Wyoming State Routes 000-099
 WYO 13 - I-80 to US 30/US 287

Transportation in Carbon County, Wyoming
Transportation in Albany County, Wyoming
013